is a subway station in Toshima, Tokyo, Japan, operated by the Tokyo subway operator Tokyo Metro.

Lines
Kanamechō Station is served by the Tokyo Metro Yurakucho Line (station number "Y-08") and the Tokyo Metro Fukutoshin Line (station number "F-08").

Station layout
The station consists of two island platforms on different levels. The Yurakucho Line platform (tracks 1 and 2) is located on the second basement ("B2F") level, while the Fukutoshin Line platform (tracks 3 and 4) is located on the third basement ("B3F") level.  The platforms are equipped with waist-height platform edge doors.

Platforms

History
The station opened on 24 June 1983, serving the Tokyo Metro Yurakucho Line. The Tokyo Metro Fukutoshin Line also started operating through this station on 14 June 2008.

The station facilities were inherited by Tokyo Metro after the privatization of the Teito Rapid Transit Authority (TRTA) in 2004.

Waist-height platform edge doors were installed in January 2011.

References

External links

  

Railway stations in Japan opened in 1983
Stations of Tokyo Metro
Tokyo Metro Yurakucho Line
Tokyo Metro Fukutoshin Line
Railway stations in Tokyo